Poly(A)-binding protein interacting protein 2B, Paip2b, which represses mRNA translation, is mainly expressed in the oocytes and fertilized eggs in mice.

Paip2b is a PAIP2 family protein, with 3 amino acids longer than its homologous Paip2a.

References

MicroRNA
Antisense RNA